KPGT (89.1 FM) is a radio station broadcasting a religious format. Licensed to Watertown, South Dakota, United States, the station serves the Watertown area. The station is owned by Harvest Community Baptist Church of Watertown, South Dakota.

Construction permit
KPGT has been granted a U.S. Federal Communications Commission construction permit to raise its ERP to 30,000 watts and increase its height above average terrain (HAAT) to 239 meters.

References

External links
KPGT official website

PGT